Phoenicophanta modestula is a moth in the family Noctuidae (the owlet moths) first described by Harrison Gray Dyar Jr. in 1924. It is found in North America.

The MONA or Hodges number for Phoenicophanta modestula is 9029.

References

Further reading

External links
 

Eustrotiinae
Articles created by Qbugbot
Moths described in 1924